La Perla is a Municipality in Veracruz, Mexico. It is located in central zone of the State of Veracruz, about 75 km from state capital Xalapa. It has a surface of 199.880 km2.

The municipality of La Perla is bordered to the north by Coscomatepec and Calcahualco to the east by Chocamán and Atzacan, to the south by Mariano Escobedo, Ixhuatlancillo, Maltrata and to the west by Puebla State.

Major crops are maize, beans, potatoes and faba bean. The weather in La Perla is cold all year with rain in summer and autumn.

The celebration in honor of Our Lady of Guadalupe, patron of the town, is in December.

As of March 3, 2021, sixteen confirmed cases and two deaths related to the COVID-19 pandemic in Mexico had been reported.

Melquiades Vázquez Lucas (″El Pantera″), candidate for mayor, was assassinated on March 4, 2021.

References

External links 

  Municipal Official webpage
  Municipal Official Information

Municipalities of Veracruz